Butts may refer to:

People
 Butts (surname)
 Butts Giraud (born before 1965), Canadian football player, professional wrestler and businessman
 Butts Wagner (1871–1928), American professional baseball player

Places

United States
 Butts Bridge, in Canterbury, Connecticut
 Butts, Georgia, a community in Jenkins County, Georgia
 Butts County, Georgia, named after Samuel Butts
 Butts County School District
 National Register of Historic Places listings in Butts County, Georgia
 Butts, Missouri, an unincorporated community

United Kingdom
 Butts Close, a park in Hitchin, Hertfordshire, England
 Butts Ferry, a hand-operated pedestrian cable ferry in Exeter, Devon, England
 The Butts Ground, a former cricket ground in Coventry, Warwickshire, England
 Butts Junction, a former railway junction near Alton, Hampshire, England
 Butts Lane Halt railway station, a former station in Blowick, Southport, Merseyside
 Butts Park Arena, a multi-use sports stadium in Coventry, England
 Butts Spur Line, an English former freight railway

Other
 Butts Band, a British and American group formed by ex-Doors members

See also

 BUT (disambiguation)
 Butt (disambiguation)
 Butte (disambiguation)
 Buttocks